Nehemiah Guthridge (c.1808 - 27 June 1878), was an Irish-born Melbourne ironmonger, a city councillor in Melbourne, a parliamentarian representing the Central Province (November 1856 to August 1858) in the Legislative Council, a prominent Wesleyan and the first mayor of Sale in 1863.

Guthridge was born in County Fermanagh, Ireland, the son of Thomas Guthridge, a farmer, and Jane, nee Quigley. 
Guthridge and William Nicholson were among the first promoters of the Melbourne and Hobson's Bay Railway Company, also providing funding for the initial survey. He also provided considerable financing for the Ballarat and Geelong railway projects.

Guthridge was married to Martha Erskine (*1814). The family arrived in June 1841 as bounty immigrants (under a scheme first proposed by Edward Gibbon Wakefield) at Port Phillip from Liverpool via Rio de Janeiro aboard the H.M.S. Frankfield. The ship's passenger list records "Nehemiah Guthridge 29, Fermanagh, Martha Guthridge 27 wife of Nehemiah, and Thomas Guthridge 2 son of Nehemiah".

On 14 March 1849 Guthridge bought lot no. 2 of the Crown Allotment in Richmond, Victoria.

Children
Thomas Guthridge,   b. 1839, England
Richard Guthridge,   b. 1844, Melbourne
Ella Guthridge,   b. 1847, Melbourne
Nehemiah Guthridge,   b. 1849, Melbourne
Lissa Guthridge,   b. 1851, Richmond
Edward Erskine Guthridge,   b. 1853, Richmond, d. 1874, Victoria
Martha Anna Guthridge,   b. 1855, Melbourne
Lilly Araminta Guthridge,   b. 1857, Northcote 
Inscription on gravestone "Edward E. Guthridge, aged 21 years, fifth son of Nehemiah and Martha Guthridge, was drowned by the swamping of a boat in the Lower Yarra on 31 May 1874" 

Guthridge arrived in Sale, Victoria in November 1862, and took over the ironmongery business carried on by Messrs. Thomson and Neils, renaming it the "Gippsland Hardware Co." Guthridge became the first Mayor of Sale in 1863, and was again elected in 1864, 1869, and 1873.

Guthridge died on 27 June 1878 at Emerald Hill, Victoria.

External links
Australia's Early Immigration Schemes

References

1808 births
1878 deaths
Members of the Victorian Legislative Council
Irish emigrants to colonial Australia
Mayors of places in Victoria (Australia)
19th-century Australian politicians
19th-century Australian businesspeople